Colégio Suíço-Brasileiro de Curitiba is a Swiss international school in Pinhais, Paraná, Brazil, near Curitiba. It serves students from infant education (Educação Infantil/Kindergarten) until high school (Gymnasialstufe/Ensino Médio).

The school opened on 3 March 1980, established by Associação Colégio Suíço-Brasileiro de Curitiba, which itself was created through the efforts of corporations with operations in the area. In 1983 the school moved to the Agua Verde neighbourhood and opened in a rental property of the Ukrainian church (Igreja Ucraniana), and on 3 March 1993 it opened in its current campus. It began offering the International Baccalaureate in 1999.

References

External links
 Colégio Suíço-Brasileiro de Curitiba
 Colégio Suíço-Brasileiro de Curitiba 
 Colégio Suíço-Brasileiro de Curitiba 
 Schweizerschule Curitiba - EAD, Swiss National Library 

Curitiba
International Baccalaureate schools in Brazil
Education in Curitiba
1980 establishments in Brazil
Educational institutions established in 1980